Vesperus conicicollis is a species of brown coloured beetle in the family Vesperidae, found in Portugal, Spain, and on the island of Sardinia.

References

Vesperidae
Beetles described in 1866
Beetles of Europe
Taxa named by Charles Coquerel